Renan Torres (born 25 January 1999) is a Brazilian judoka. He won the gold medal in the men's 60 kg event at the 2019 Pan American Games held in Lima, Peru.

References

External links
 

Living people
1999 births
Place of birth missing (living people)
Brazilian male judoka
Pan American Games medalists in judo
Pan American Games gold medalists for Brazil
Judoka at the 2019 Pan American Games
Medalists at the 2019 Pan American Games
21st-century Brazilian people
20th-century Brazilian people